Penicillium zonatum is an anamorph species of fungus in the genus Penicillium which was isolated from soil. Penicillium zonatum produces xanthomegin, brefeldin A and janthitrem B

References

Further reading 
 
 

zonatum
Fungi described in 1973